Robert Bryan Gilder (born December 31, 1950) is an American professional golfer. He won six tournaments on the PGA Tour and currently plays on the Champions Tour, where he has ten wins since joining in 2001.

Early years
Born in Corvallis, Oregon, Gilder graduated from Corvallis High School and attended Arizona State University in Tempe. He walked on to the Sun Devils' golf team, and was the 1973 Western Athletic Conference individual golf champion.

PGA Tour

Gilder turned pro later that year and found success soon thereafter. He won a tournament on the Australian Tour, New Zealand Open, a year after turning professional. He shot 283 (−5) and defeated Australia's Jack Newton and New Zealand legend Bob Charles in a playoff. He won his first PGA Tour tournament a year and a half later at the 1976 Phoenix Open. He won six times during his career, including three in 1982. Gilder was a tour mainstay for many years, and played on the Ryder Cup team in 1983.

Gilder may be best remembered for his double eagle in 1982 at the Manufacturers Hanover Westchester Classic. It took place during the third round, at the  par-5 18th hole of the Westchester Country Club, just north of New York City. A plaque on the 18th fairway commemorates the feat. It gave him a 192 (−18) for 54 holes, which tied a tour record. It also doubled his lead to a comfortable six strokes; he won the tournament by five strokes on Sunday with a 69 to finish at 261 (−19).

Gilder won one of the longest sudden death playoffs in PGA Tour history at the Phoenix Open in January 1983. It took him eight holes to defeat Rex Caldwell, Johnny Miller, and Mark O'Meara. It was his second win in Phoenix and sixth and final victory on the PGA Tour.

Champions Tour
At the end of 2000, Gilder became eligible to play on the Senior PGA Tour (later Champions Tour) and found immediate success, winning two tournaments and being named Rookie of the Year in 2001.

After winning tournaments in five out of his first six years on the Champions Tour, Gilder entered a victory drought of almost five years. In the first seven individual events of the 2011 season, he placed no higher than a tie for 56th place, and had struggled to a stroke average of over 73.5 per round. However, Gilder ended his drought with a come-from-behind win in the Principal Charity Classic, a tournament he had previously won in 2002. With three birdies on his final four holes, including a birdie on the notoriously difficult 18th hole, Gilder was the victor by one shot over Champions Tour rookie Mark Brooks, who was seeking his first win on the senior circuit. This victory gave Gilder his milestone 10th victory on the Champions Tour.

Gilder was inducted into the Oregon Sports Hall of Fame in 2002.

Gilder is a lifelong resident of Corvallis, Oregon. He enjoys auto racing and has competed in Trans-Am races. Gilder and his wife, Peggy, have a grandson with cystic fibrosis and are involved with several charities that help battle the disease including Doernbecher Children's Hospital and the Cystic Fibrosis Foundation.

Amateur wins
1973 Western Athletic Conference Championship (individual)

Professional wins (24)

PGA Tour wins (6)

PGA Tour playoff record (1–0)

Japan Golf Tour wins (3)

*Note: The 1990 Acom P.T. was shortened to 54 holes due to rain.

PGA Tour of Australasia wins (1)

PGA Tour of Australasia playoff record (1–0)

Other wins (4)
1987 Northwest Open
1988 Isuzu Kapalua International, Acom Team Championship (with Doug Tewell) (Japan)
1989 Spalding Invitational

Champions Tour wins (10)

Champions Tour playoff record (3–0)

Results in major championships

CUT = missed the half-way cut
"T" = tied

Summary

Most consecutive cuts made – 8 (1981 PGA – 1983 PGA)
Longest streak of top-10s – 2 (1988 U.S. Open – 1988 PGA)

Results in The Players Championship

CUT = missed the halfway cut
"T" indicates a tie for a place

U.S. national team appearances
Professional
Ryder Cup: 1983 (winners)
World Cup: 1982
UBS Warburg Cup: 2002 (winners)

See also
Fall 1975 PGA Tour Qualifying School graduates
1997 PGA Tour Qualifying School graduates
List of golfers with most PGA Tour Champions wins

References

External links

American male golfers
Arizona State Sun Devils men's golfers
PGA Tour golfers
PGA Tour Champions golfers
Ryder Cup competitors for the United States
Golfers from Oregon
Trans-Am Series drivers
Sportspeople from Corvallis, Oregon
Corvallis High School (Oregon) alumni
1950 births
Living people